Gold ring may refer to:
 The Gold Ring; A group (ring) of conspirators who manipulated the U.S. gold market on September 24, 1869, aka Black Friday
 Gold Ring, an Arabic comic
 Gold ring of Pietroassa
 Wedding ring
 Engagement ring

See also
 Rings of Gold, country music single
 Goldring (disambiguation)
 Golden Ring (disambiguation)